The Meth Lab is the fifth studio album by American rapper and Wu-Tang Clan member Method Man. The album was released on August 21, 2015, under Hanz On Music and Tommy Boy Entertainment. His first album since 2006's 4:21... The Day After, the album features guest appearances from Redman, Hanz On, Streetlife, and Wu-Tang Clan members Raekwon, Inspectah Deck and Masta Killa. It was recorded in Staten Island at Track Stars Studios on VanDuzer Street under the supervision of executive producer Hanz On and producer/engineer Pascal Zumaque.

Critical reception

The Meth Lab received mixed reviews from music critics. At Metacritic, which assigns a normalized rating out of 100 to reviews from mainstream critics, the album received an average score of 59 based on 11 reviews, which indicates "mixed or average reviews". David Jeffries of AllMusic gave the album three and a half stars out of five, saying "Uncle Murda, Streetlife, and Hanz On appear often, making this LP close in structure to the crew-focused Theodore Unit releases from Ghostface, but that's not a complaint as much as a caution. Consider this a Meth-led posse LP aimed at returning fans, and a very good one at that." Paul Cantor of Billboard said, "Method's skill and charisma are by far the highlight of The Meth Lab, but there's not enough of him to make this unremarkable compilation pop." Del F. Cowie of Exclaim! stated, "Too often, the album is weighed down by pedantic, average beats and too many run of the mill guest verses, indicating Meth's generosity is a bit of a weakness. Ultimately, it dilutes The Meth Lab'''s potency." Andrew Gretchko of HipHopDX said, "The Meth Lab'' may be Method Man’s return to solo work, but without a true connection between the tracks the album feels more like a mixtape than an album, a string of songs that range from uninspiring to a reminder that Method Man was once one of Hip Hop’s elite."

Track listing

Charts

References

2015 albums
Method Man albums
Albums produced by J57
Albums produced by Ron Browz
Albums produced by Mathematics
Albums produced by 4th Disciple